Ke Zhao (Chinese: 柯钊; born 25 March 1989, in Huangshi) is a Chinese footballer who plays for China Super League club Henan Jianye as a right-footed left-back.

Club career
Ke Zhao would play for the Wuhan Optics Valley youth team before being selected to represent Hubei in football at the 2009 National Games of China. When he returned from the tournament, his club had been disbanded for their on-field behaviour by the Chinese FA. A Phoenix club established by the Hubei Province soccer association would offer Ke the chance to join their new club called Hubei Luyin and play in the third tier. He would start his professional career in the 2009 China League Two campaign and in his, as well as the club's, debut season, and go on to win promotion from the division.

At the now renamed Wuhan Zall, Ke would establish himself as a vital member of the team's defense and go on to win promotion to the top-tier with the club at the end of the 2012 campaign. He would make his Chinese Super League debut for Wuhan on 8 March 2013, in a game against Jiangsu Sainty that ended in a 2-1 defeat. His following game on 16 March 2013 against Beijing Guoan ended in a 1-0 defeat and Ke was given a yellow-card-violation for a tough-tackle against Darko Matić before the referee blew the whistle to end the game. However, the Chinese FA would retroactively impose a four-game ban and a fine of 20,000 Yuan for the incident.

On 24 January 2017, Ke moved to the Super League side Henan Jianye. On 5 March 2017, he made his debut for Henan in a 0–0 home draw against Hebei China Fortune.

Career statistics 
Statistics accurate as of match played 31 December 2020.

References

External links
 

1989 births
Living people
People from Huangshi
Chinese footballers
Footballers from Hubei
Wuhan F.C. players
Henan Songshan Longmen F.C. players
Chinese Super League players
China League One players
China League Two players
Association football fullbacks